Jany Temime is a French costume designer. She is best known for her work on the final six films in the Harry Potter film series, each of which garnered her Saturn Award nominations. She won the Costume Designers Guild Award in 2012 for the 2011 film Harry Potter and the Deathly Hallows – Part 2 and in 2013 for the 2012 film Skyfall.

Life and career
Temime spent most of her childhood in Paris, France. The daughter of French ready-to-wear company owners, she progressed from creating outfits for her dolls to designing, fitting, and producing costumes for her entire class's school play at the age of eight. In Paris, she earned master's degrees in French and Literature (or Latin) at Paris Nanterre University, as well as a certificate in Art History. Her first job was at lifestyle magazine Elle as a fashion journalist. While training there, she was advised to start a career in the film industry. She subsequently moved to the Netherlands where she started by designing for short films and commercials. She later gained recognition for her work on several major Dutch film productions, such as De Lift, Ciske de Rat, Op hoop van zegen, as well as Academy Award-winning productions Antonia's Line and Character. After moving to London, England, Temime served as costume designer for the last six films in the Harry Potter film series, the 2013 film Gravity, and two films in the James Bond film series, Skyfall and Spectre, elevating her expertise to international recognition.

Succeeding Lindy Hemming as costume designer for the third film of the Harry Potter film series, Harry Potter and the Prisoner of Azkaban, Temime was tasked with reinventing the established look of the then two-part-series. Highlighting the actors' coming of age and giving the series an overall more realistic and relatable look was important for both Temime and the film's director Alfonso Cuarón who had also been new to the series. Though Cuarón would not be involved with any future installments, Temime kept her role up until the final film, each new film challenging her to adapt her costumes to the characters' growing age and unique arcs.

After working on several period films and a decade of designing for the Harry Potter fantasy series, Temime transitioned to designing reality-based space suits for the 2013 film Gravity, which, as she claims in an interview with The New York Times, proved to be her biggest technical challenge up until that point. After thorough research into actual space suit designs, Temime had to make significant – preferably unnoticeable – changes to accommodate the actors, while still retaining a scientifically accurate look. In order to allow lead actress Sandra Bullock to easily open the suit and undress by herself, Temime moved the zipper to the front of the torso and removed the cooling garment and diaper, changes that were criticized by the scientific community. For the project, Temime deviated from her usual pen-to-paper approach to conceptualization and created the costumes in a digital 3D environment instead.

With her involvement in the 23rd and 24th James Bond film, Skyfall and Spectre, Temime's work was specifically centered around adjusting the Bond girl's appearance to today's society's idea of femininity, as well as making their outfits more functional and logical. Whereas older entries meant to dress Bond girls solely for the purpose of eye candy, modern Bond girls were supposed to have a more sophisticated, feminist, and independent approach to their style, according to Temime.

Temime declined to return as costume designer for the Harry Potter spin-off film Fantastic Beasts and Where to Find Them because she felt that her involvement with the franchise was meant to end after the conclusion of the main series.

In 2017, Temime joined artists' supply brand Prismacolor, products of which she frequently uses for her own work, as an advocate.

Controversy
During the promotion of Harry Potter and the Deathly Hallows – Part 1 in 2010, Temime, who served as the film's costume designer, was widely accused of copying a dress from the Alexander McQueen fall 2008 collection "The Girl Who Lived in the Tree" for the film. The white layered tulle dress, worn by the character Fleur Delacour in the context of a wedding ceremony, features a pattern of two phoenixes facing each other on the bodice and black over-laid peacock feathers dissolving down the length of the dress. The latter appears to be directly copied from the Alexander McQueen dress, while the peacock motif was slightly altered to more closely resemble the phoenix. Temime has commented in an interview with the Los Angeles Times that she wanted the dress to be a "witch wedding dress but not a Halloween dress. The dress is white but it needed to have something fantastic to it. So there is the phoenix [motif], the bird, which is a symbol of love in a way because there is rebirth, love never dies, it is born again."

Personal life
Temime has maintained a friendship with actress Emma Watson, whom she dressed for the role of Hermione Granger in Harry Potter over a span of six films. As Watson began modelling for such brands as Chanel and Burberry, Temime was hired as her stylist for film premieres.

Filmography

Film

Television

Awards and honours
BAFTA Awards, Wales
 1998: House of America, Best Costume.
Costume Designers Guild Awards
 2012: Harry Potter and the Deathly Hallows – Part 2, Excellence in Fantasy Film.
 2013: Skyfall, Excellence in Contemporary Film.
 2023: House of the Dragon, Excellence in Sci-Fi/Fantasy Television.
Netherlands Film Festival
 1995: Special Jury Prize for her costume designs.
Rembrandt Awards
 2010: Honorary Rembrandt Award for her work as costume designer.

References

External links

Living people
Women costume designers
French costume designers
Year of birth missing (living people)